Percy Frobisher Pilbeam is a fictional character in the works of P. G. Wodehouse. A journalist turned detective, he is a rather weak and unpleasant man, generally disliked by all. He appears in several novels, but is perhaps best known for his involvement with the denizens of Blandings Castle, in Summer Lightning (1929) and Heavy Weather (1933).

Character
Pilbeam is a rather slimy-looking man, with shiny black hair in a marcelled wave, eyes a little too close together, pimples and a shabby-looking moustache (which is occasionally described as "fungoid"). He has a tendency to dress in rather loud check suits, and a taste for pretty girls. He has an efficient and practical mind, full of pep and vigour.

A member of the "Junior Constitutional Club", and an F.R.Z.S., Pilbeam is also a keen motorcyclist. His taste for girls is clear in his approval of Miss "Flick" Sheridan, and his adoration and pursuit of Sue Brown (which enrages Ronnie Fish to the extent of running amok and destroying a restaurant).

Pilbeam has a paralysing fear of pigs, having read once that a pig, on finding a stranger in its sty, will go for him like a tiger and tear him to ribbons. He has a fondness for champagne, a drink he finds highly useful in priming himself for tense meetings with the nobility.

Appearances
Bill the Conqueror (1924) - in which Lord Tilbury first employs him as a snoop
Sam the Sudden (1925) (U.S. title: Sam in the Suburbs) - in which he is mentioned only in passing
Summer Lightning (1929) (US title: Fish Preferred) - in which he visits Blandings Castle
Heavy Weather (1933) - in which he is still at Blandings
Something Fishy (1957) (US title: The Butler Did It) - in which his agency is again employed
Frozen Assets (US title: Biffen's Millions) (1964)- in which he is re-employed by Lord Tilbury.

Career
Pilbeam is introduced in Bill the Conqueror, at which time he is deputy to Roderick Pyke as editor of Society Spice, but considered a far more capable and trustworthy man by Roderick's father, Lord Tilbury, head of the Mammoth Publishing Company. Tilbury trusts Pilbeam with many a delicate task, and is rarely disappointed by the young man's work.

After Roderick leaves his father's employ, Pilbeam takes over as head of Society Spice, in which position we hear of him in passing in Sam the Sudden. He spends some three years there, during which he incurs the wrath of Galahad Threepwood. He leaves his job, much to Lord Tilbury's indignation, to found the Argus Detective Agency, which he runs from offices in an alley off Beeston Street, in South-West London, telegraphic address "Pilgus Piccy".

He was hired, in the early days of the organisation, to retrieve some compromising letters for Sir Gregory Parsloe-Parsloe, a task he achieved by impersonating a man come to read the gas meter and breaking into a safe. We hear about this later, in Summer Lightning, when Parsloe-Parsloe hires him once more to steal Galahad Threepwood's scandalous book of reminiscences, just after Lord Emsworth has called him in to investigate the disappearance of his prize pig, Empress of Blandings, and Millicent Threepwood has had him tail her fiancé Hugo Carmody.

His time at Blandings Castle is somewhat tense, with Carmody, Galahad and Ronnie Fish holding grudges against him, and he feels entirely out of place and uncomfortable amongst the well-bred, well-dressed Threepwood family and their friends. However, he remains there into the events of Heavy Weather, when he is once again asked to steal Galahad's book by Parsloe-Parsloe. For a time he has hopes of making a large sum of money from the book, but his hopes are dashed; however, he does get well rewarded, when he agrees to employ Monty Bodkin in his detective agency.

He reappears in Something Fishy, published some 24 years later.

Television 

In a 1995 adaptation of Heavy Weather, made by the BBC and partners and broadcast in the United States by PBS, Pilbeam was played by David Bamber.

External links 

 
 Percy Pilbeam page at the Thrilling Detective Web Site

P. G. Wodehouse characters
Literary characters introduced in 1924